Kivel is a surname. Notable people with the surname include:

Barry Kivel, American actor, director, editor, and producer
Paul Kivel, American writer, educator, and activist

See also
Kivell